Son Ji-chang (born February 20, 1970) is a South Korean actor, singer and songwriter. He starred in television series such as Mudong's House (1991), The Last Match (1994), Trio (2002), and Rose Fence (2003). He is also member of musical duo The Blue.

Filmography

Television series

Variety shows

Awards and nominations

Legal matters 

According to Mr. Son's Facebook, on September 10, 2016, his all electric Sport Utility Vehicle Tesla Model X crashed into his garage.

He has been requesting Tesla Inc. to investigate the accident. Tesla has stated that logs downloaded from the car show that the driver pressed the accelerator instead of the brake. Tesla's press statement to Reuters states,

“We take the safety of our customers very seriously and conducted a thorough investigation following Mr. Son's claims. The evidence, including data from the car, conclusively shows that the crash was the result of Mr. Son pressing the accelerator pedal all the way to 100%.”

It also asserts that the actor threatened to use his celebrity to damage Tesla,

“Before filing his class action lawsuit against Tesla, Mr. Son had threatened to use his celebrity status in Korea to hurt Tesla unless we agreed to make a financial payment and acknowledge that the vehicle accelerated on its own. However, the evidence clearly shows the vehicle was not at fault. Our policy is to stand by the evidence and not to give in to ultimatums."

According to the NHTSA, there have been about 16,000 preventable pedal error automobile collisions in the U.S. every year.

Nevertheless, Son filed a lawsuit to claim damages.

On Friday, March 31, 2017, Tesla submitted a motion for an order to dismiss 13 of the 27 causes of action in Plaintiffs’ First Amended Complaint ("FAC") citing that they are not relevant to the laws.

The plaintiff now has 15 days as of April 15, 2019 to amend the complaint or the lawsuit is dismissed by U.S. District Judge James V. Selna. The slander and defamation filing is outside of the one-year statute of limitations. For the false advertising and breach of warranty claims, the Judge ruled that Tesla's designs are for safety enhancement and not to prevent the plaintiff's claims of sudden unintended acceleration.

References

External links

1970 births
Living people
South Korean male television actors
South Korean male film actors
People from Seoul
21st-century South Korean male singers
South Korean male singer-songwriters
Best New Actor Paeksang Arts Award (television) winners